James Ley (born 1971) is an Australian literary critic and essayist.

Early life and education
James Ley was born in South Australia and grew up in Armidale, New South Wales.

Career
After some time as a freelance critic, Ley founded the Sydney Review of Books. For the Sydney Review of Books, he has written essays on writers such as Ali Smith, Lydia Davis, Ottessa Moshfegh, and Helen Garner. He has been a judge for major fiction prizes in Australia.

He is a prolific critic of Australian Literature. When he won the Geraldine Pascall Prize for Australian Critic of the Year, the judges stated that: 'He operates at the point where scholarly precision and essayistic liberty intersect. ... In a Ley review, you may be sure that an independent opinion informed by wide reading and sharp thinking is being stated'.

Selected works

References

1971 births
Living people
Literary critics of English
Australian literary critics
People from South Australia